Ionuț Balaur (born 6 June 1989) is a Romanian footballer who plays as a centre back for CS Mioveni, in the Liga I. In his career, Balaur also played for teams such as FC Vaslui, ASA 2013 Târgu Mureș or FC Voluntari, among others.

Club career

FC Vaslui
Balaur was the only player of FC Vaslui that was born in Vaslui. He made a single substitute appearance for the club in the 2006–07 season. In the following seasons he was loaned to different teams like CSM Focșani or CS Otopeni. At the start of the 11/12 season he returned to FC Vaslui. Despite him being a striker, he was used as a central defender after Papp and Cânu's long-term injuries and FC Vaslui's transfers ban. He made some fantastic games in the Europa League and in Liga I as a central defender and was seen as a future important player for the team. Unfortunately, he suffered an injury in January 2012 that kept him out for 6 months. Following the team dissolving due to financial problems Balaur decided to leave the club.

ASA Târgu Mureș
In 2014, Balaur signed a two-years contract with the Romanian vice-champions ASA Târgu Mureș being a very constant player for the team reaching Romanian Cup and top standings in the league with his club.

FC Voluntari
In 2016, Balaur signed a contract with the Bucharest-based club FC Voluntari and becoming an important player for the club becoming the captain of the squad several times during the 2017/18 season.

Statistics
Statistics accurate as of match played 10 March 2023

Honours

FC Vaslui
Cupa României runner-up: 2009–10
ASA Târgu Mureș
Supercupa României: 2015
FC Voluntari
Cupa României: 2016–17
Supercupa României: 2017

References

External links

Sportspeople from Vaslui
1989 births
Living people
Romanian footballers
Association football defenders
Liga I players
Liga II players
CSM Focșani players
FC Vaslui players
ASA 2013 Târgu Mureș players
FC Voluntari players
FC Dunărea Călărași players
CS Mioveni players